Zalemenga is a rural locality (a selo) in Lipovskoye Rural Settlement of Velsky District, Arkhangelsk Oblast, Russia. The population was 33 as of 2014. There are 3 streets.

Geography 
Zalemenga is located on the Puya River, 97 km north of Velsk (the district's administrative centre) by road. Malaya Lipovka is the nearest rural locality.

References 

Rural localities in Velsky District